Venice Gardens is a census-designated place (CDP) in Sarasota County, Florida, United States. The population was 7,104 at the 2010 census. It is part of the Bradenton–Sarasota–Venice Metropolitan Statistical Area.

Geography
Venice Gardens is located at  (27.070534, -82.407844).

Demographics

As of the census of 2000, there were 7,466 people, 3,528 households, and 2,342 families residing in the CDP. The racial makeup of the CDP was 97.43% White, 0.40% African American, 0.08% Native American, 1.25% Asian, 0.15% from other races, and 0.70% from two or more races. Hispanic or Latino of any race were 1.34% of the population.

There were 3,528 households, out of which 16.8% had children under the age of 18 living with them, 55.7% were married couples living together, 8.1% had a female householder with no husband present, and 33.6% were non-families. 28.4% of all households were made up of individuals, and 19.4% had someone living alone who was 65 years of age or older.  The average household size was 2.12 and the average family size was 2.52.

In the CDP, the population was spread out, with 14.5% under the age of 18, 3.9% from 18 to 24, 19.1% from 25 to 44, 25.3% from 45 to 64, and 37.2% who were 65 years of age or older.  The median age was 55 years. For every 100 females, there were 86.4 males.  For every 100 females age 18 and over, there were 84.2 males.

The median income for a household in the CDP was $38,807, and the median income for a family was $45,911. Males had a median income of $28,790 versus $26,000 for females. The per capita income for the CDP was $21,440.  About 3.3% of families and 5.8% of the population were below the poverty line, including 14.9% of those under age 18 and 2.8% of those age 65 or over.

References

Census-designated places in Sarasota County, Florida
Sarasota metropolitan area
Census-designated places in Florida